BlinkyTM (stylized as Blinky™) is a 2011 Irish-American short science fiction-horror film written, edited, and directed by Ruairí Robinson. The film stars Max Records, Robinson, Jenni Fontana, and James Nardini. It tells the story of a boy who adopts a robot and begins neglecting it, until the robot complies with commands to murder. The film was released on March 20, 2011.

Plot
In the near future, where robotics have greatly evolved, Alex is looking for the normal loving family that he doesn't have - his parents are always too busy fighting with each other to worry about the effect on him. After seeing an advertisement for a domestic robot named 'Blinky', he asks his parents for one for Christmas, hoping that it will bring his family together as is shown in the advert. Blinky's advertisement and conduct at this point indicate that Blinky is specifically designed to provide friendship to its masters. After obtaining Blinky and playing with him for a while, shown in a home-video style montage, Alex feels disappointment in the fact that Blinky hasn't changed anything and his parents continue to argue. Eventually, Alex becomes tired of the robot and ignores him, even when Blinky persistently asks to play games.

After leaving Blinky to count down from 1 million outside in the rain in a game of Hide and Seek, Alex becomes frustrated and gives Blinky multiple conflicting orders, such as telling him to be still and at the same time cleaning up, as well as telling him to kill both his parents, himself, their dog and everyone else in his rage, leading Blinky to malfunction. After Alex informs his mother about the glitched robot and that they need to buy a new one, she suggests rebooting him, and that Alex must clean up the mess he made or she will tell Blinky to ″clean [him] up and cook [him] for dinner". Alex reboots Blinky, appearing to have reverted to factory settings, and asking Alex "will you be my best friend?" Alex continues to ignore Blinky as normal.

Soon afterwards, Blinky starts to behave abnormally, such as showing up in Alex's room overnight, and continuing the count down from before. The next day the family dog appears to be gone, with Alex believing that the robot had something to do with it. He tells his mother his forebodings, but she thinks he's just already tired of Blinky and wants a new robot. The next day Alex goes into another rage with Blinky, throwing an electronic tablet at him. The tablet simply shatters glass throughout the room, causing no damage to Blinky. Alex gets even angrier and blames the mess on Blinky, so Blinky retreats to the kitchen to 'clean', counting down from 10 and grabbing an electric knife from the drawers, proclaiming "ready or not, here I come". That evening, both parents are eating dinner at the table, with Blinky present and Alex's seat empty. As Alex's mother asks Blinky if he has seen Alex, the robot replies that he is right there at the table, and reveals that he has carried out both his and the mother's 'command' from before: he has killed Alex, cleaned him and cooked him into meatballs, which they are now eating. The parents scream in horror as Blinky asks if he has "done good".

While a TV advertisement orders the people to contact immediately if Blinky acts abnormally, the police arrive at the house as Blinky is cleaning up supposedly the parents' blood. He lets two officers into the house, and shuts the door behind them. The last shot shows Blinky as he kills his next victims, himself and the camera covered in blood, as he carries out Alex's past 'commands' to kill everybody.

Cast
Max Records as Alex Neville 
Ruairí Robinson as Blinky (voice)
Jenni Fontana as Mrs. Neville
James Nardini as Mr. Neville
Joe Childs as Blinky's performance capture

Production
BlinkyTM was based on a short story by writer/director Ruairí Robinson. The film was shot in Granada Hills, Los Angeles, California.

External links

BlinkyTM on YouTube

2011 films
American horror short films
Irish short films
American science fiction short films
2011 short films
Robot films
American robot films
Films scored by Ólafur Arnalds
English-language Irish films
2010s American films